John Arrowsmith (29 March 1602 – 15 February 1659) was an English theologian and academic.

Life
Arrowsmith was born near Gateshead and entered St John's College, Cambridge, in 1616.  In 1623 he entered the fellowship of St Catherine Hall, Cambridge.

In 1631 he became a preacher at King's Lynn, Norfolk. He was a member of the Westminster Assembly and preached to the Long Parliament on a number of occasions. He was elected as Master of St Johns, Cambridge, on 11 April 1644. In 1645 he became rector of St Martin Pomary, London. He served as Vice-Chancellor of the University in 1647–1648.

In 1651, he was elected Regius Professor of Divinity, and, in 1653, Master of Trinity College. He resigned his professorship in 1655 and died on 15 February 1659 in Cambridge.

Works
The Covenant-avenging Sword Brandished (1643)
Englands Eben-ezer (1645)A Great Wonder in Heaven (1647)Armilla Catechetica (Cambridge, 1659)Tactica Sacra (Amsterdam, 1657)

References

LinksConcise Dictionary of National Biography''
The Master of Trinity at Trinity College, Cambridge

External links
Biography

 

1602 births
1659 deaths
Masters of St John's College, Cambridge
Masters of Trinity College, Cambridge
Westminster Divines
Alumni of St John's College, Cambridge
People from Gateshead
Vice-Chancellors of the University of Cambridge
Fellows of St Catharine's College, Cambridge
Regius Professors of Divinity (University of Cambridge)
17th-century English theologians
English Calvinist and Reformed theologians
17th-century Calvinist and Reformed theologians
English male non-fiction writers